Orpecovalva kasyi is a moth in the family Autostichidae. It was described by László Anthony Gozmány in 1988. It is found in Morocco.

References

Moths described in 1988
Orpecovalva